George Stevens Hamilton (born August 12, 1939) is an American actor. His notable films include Home from the Hill (1960), By Love Possessed (1961), Light in the Piazza (1962), Your Cheatin' Heart (1964), Once Is Not Enough (1975), Love at First Bite (1979), Zorro, The Gay Blade (1981), The Godfather Part III (1990), Doc Hollywood (1991), 8 Heads in a Duffel Bag (1997), Hollywood Ending (2002), and The Congressman (2016). For his debut performance in Crime and Punishment U.S.A. (1959), Hamilton won a Golden Globe Award and was nominated for a BAFTA Award. He has received one additional BAFTA nomination and two Golden Globe nominations.

Hamilton began his film career in 1958, and although he has a substantial body of work in film and television, he is perhaps most famous for his debonair style, perpetual suntan, and commercials for Ritz Crackers. Bo Derek wrote in her autobiography that "there was an ongoing contest between John Derek and George Hamilton as to who was tanner."

Early life
Hamilton was born in Memphis, Tennessee, the middle of three boys with an older maternal half-brother and a younger full brother, and lived in Blytheville, Arkansas. He is the eldest son of Ann Stevens and bandleader George "Spike" Hamilton.

His stepfathers were Carleton Hunt and Jesse Spalding; his stepmother was June Howard, with whom Hamilton said he had repeated sexual relations when he was age 12, shortly after she married his father, and again later when he was an adult.

Hamilton attended the Hackley School in Tarrytown, New York, graduating in 1957.

Career

Early appearances
Hamilton's first roles were in TV. He appeared on such shows as The Veil (playing an Indian), The Adventures of Rin Tin Tin, The Donna Reed Show, and Cimarron City.

His first film role was a lead, Crime and Punishment U.S.A. (1959), directed by Denis Sanders. Although shot in 1958 it was not released until the following year. However, the film was seen by Vincente Minnelli who thought Hamilton would be ideal for the younger son in Home from the Hill (1960), a Southern melodrama with Robert Mitchum. Hamilton was cast, and the film was popular. Metro-Goldwyn-Mayer signed him to a long-term contract.

Metro-Goldwyn-Mayer
MGM cast Hamilton in support of Natalie Wood and Robert Wagner in the melodrama All the Fine Young Cannibals (1960) which flopped at the box office.

Hamilton's next film was far more popular, the beach party comedy Where the Boys Are (1960). It was a hit and remains one of his better known movies.

Hamilton wanted to do more serious material, so he appeared in the lower budgeted Angel Baby (1961), a drama about an evangelist, for Allied Artists. It had minimal commercial or critical impact. For United Artists, he supported Lana Turner in thr melodrama By Love Possessed (1961).

MGM tried to change his image by putting him in the Western A Thunder of Drums (1961); the film was mildly popular.

Hamilton lobbied hard for the role of the Italian husband in Light in the Piazza (1962), with Olivia de Havilland. The film lost money, but Hamilton received excellent notices. It was shot in Italy, and MGM kept Hamilton in Italy to play a role in Two Weeks in Another Town (1962), an unsuccessful attempt to repeat the success of The Bad and the Beautiful (1952).

Hamilton had an excellent part in The Victors (1963), an anti-war drama from Carl Foreman. It was a box-office disappointment but was critically acclaimed. Hamilton had another good role in Act One (1963), playing Moss Hart, but the movie was poorly received. He guest-starred on episodes of Bob Hope Presents the Chrysler Theatre and Burke's Law.

After making a cameo in Looking for Love (1964), Hamilton appeared in Your Cheatin' Heart (1964), playing Hank Williams. The movie was not widely seen, and Hamilton's performance received some praise. He guest-starred on episodes of The Rogues and Ben Casey.

Hamilton went to Mexico for Viva Maria! (1965). It was directed by Louis Malle who cast Hamilton on the strength of his performance in Two Weeks in Another Town. Malle said "he was a personal choice and I am happy with him...He's more interested in being in the social columns – I don't understand – when he should be one of the greatest of his generation." The film was popular in Europe, but less so in the US.

Hamilton made That Man George (1965) and appeared in a production of A Farewell to Arms (1966) on TV

He returned to MGM to make  Doctor, You've Got to Be Kidding! (1967), a romantic comedy with Sandra Dee, which was mildly popular. At Columbia, he co-starred with Glenn Ford in A Time for Killing (1967), originally directed by Roger Corman, then by Phil Karlson.

Hamilton played a cat burglar in MGM's Jack of Diamonds (1967). It was produced by Sandy Howard who said Hamilton was "a hot commodity these days" because he was dating Lyndon Johnson's daughter. Reports put his fee around this time at $100,000 per movie. He was drafted into the Army but received a 3-A deferral notice on the grounds that he was the sole financial provider for his mother. Hamilton's draft deferment was highly controversial at the time because it was thought that his relationship with the president's daughter gave him preferential treatment.)

In 1968, Hamilton made The Power.

Television
Hamilton went into television in 1969, supporting Lana Turner in the all-star series Harold Robbins' The Survivors (1969–70).

When the show was canceled in January 1970, Hamilton went into Paris 7000 (1970). He portrayed a trouble shooter for the U.S. State Department in Paris. This series was canceled in March 1970.

He starred in the TV films Togetherness (1970) and The Last of the Powerseekers, a 1971 compilation of two episodes of Harold Robbins' The Survivors.

Producer
Hamilton moved into producing to give himself greater control over his career. He produced and played the title role in Evel Knievel (1971). Hamilton had the script rewritten by John Milius, and the latter called Hamilton "a wonderful guy, totally underrated. A great con-man, that's what he really is. He always said 'I'll be remembered as a third-rate actor when in fact, I'm a first-rate con man.'"

He appeared in the TV movie The Last of the Powerseekers (1973), and had a supporting role in The Man Who Loved Cat Dancing, starring Burt Reynolds (1973).

He produced and appeared in Medusa (1973). He starred in the TV movie The Dead Don't Die (1975) and had a supporting role in Once Is Not Enough (1975). On a 1975 episode of Columbo, Hamilton played a psychiatrist who uses hypnosis to commit a murder, whose arrogant assertions in his own defence establish that he was in fact at the scene of the crime.

Hamilton guest-starred on episodes of Police Story, McCloud, Roots, The Eddie Capra Mysteries, Gibbsville, Supertrain, and Sword of Justice.

He had supporting roles in The Strange Possession of Mrs. Oliver (1977), The Happy Hooker Goes to Washington (1977), Killer on Board (1977), Sextette (1978), The Users (1978), From Hell to Victory (1979), Institute for Revenge (1979), and Death Car on the Freeway (1979).

Love at First Bite
In 1979, he appeared in the surprise hit Love at First Bite, in which he showed a flair for comedy; it was the story of Count Dracula's pursuit of a young Manhattanite model, played by Susan Saint James. The film included scenes with Dracula and his conquest as they dance to "I Love the Nightlife" at a disco. The film's box-office success created a popularity surge for Hamilton, who also served as executive producer.

He returned to TV for The Seekers (1979) and The Great Cash Giveaway Getaway (1979), then he did 1981's Zorro, The Gay Blade, which he produced.

However, Zorro was not as popular as Love at First Bite, and film leads dried up quickly. He focused on television: Malibu (1983) and Two Fathers' Justice (1985).

In the mid-1980s, Hamilton starred in the sixth season of the Aaron Spelling-produced television serial Dynasty.

He supported Joan Collins in the miniseries Monte Carlo (1986) and had the lead role in the series Spies (1987). He supported Elizabeth Taylor in Poker Alice (1987).

1990s
A break for Hamilton came in 1990 when Francis Ford Coppola cast him as the Corleone family's lawyer in The Godfather Part III.

For the second time, he portrayed a murderer on the television series Columbo, starring as the host of a TV true-crime show in the 1991 episode "Caution: Murder Can Be Hazardous to Your Health". He had been in the 1975 episode "A Deadly State of Mind".

Hamilton had small roles in Doc Hollywood (1991), Once Upon a Crime (1992), and Amore! (1993), and guest-starred on Diagnosis: Murder and Dream On. He went to Germany to make  (1993). He did Two Fathers: Justice for the Innocent (1994), Vanished (1995), and Playback (1996); and guest-starred on the shows Bonnie, Hart to Hart, and The Guilt.

He was in Meet Wally Sparks (1997), 8 Heads in a Duffel Bag (1997), and the miniseries Rough Riders (1997), where he portrayed William Randolph Hearst. With his matinee-idol looks, it was sometimes noted that Hamilton physically resembled Warren Beatty. Beatty's political satire Bulworth (1998) contained a running gag, with Hamilton'appearing as himself Hamilton had a regular role on the TV series Jenny (1997).

He was in Casper Meets Wendy (1998), P.T. Barnum (1999), and She's Too Tall (1999). He was a semi-regular celebrity guest on the 1998-1999 syndicated version of Match Game.

2000s
In 2001, Hamilton starred on Broadway in the play Chicago in the role of Billy Flynn. He played the roles from November 21, 2001 to February 17, 2002; June 04, 2002 to July 29, 2002; and from September 14, 2007 to October 07, 2007.

In 2003, Hamilton hosted The Family, a reality television series, for one season. The program starred 10 members from a traditional Italian-American family, each fighting for a prize of $1 million. In 2006, Hamilton competed in the second season of  Dancing with the Stars with professional Edyta Sliwinska in which they lasted until the sixth round. At age 66 and recovering from knee injuries, Hamilton, unable to match the limber dance moves of his younger competitors, charmed the audience and judges with endearingly silly dances that used props, including a Zorro mask and the sword from Zorro, The Gay Blade.

In 2006, it was rumored that Hamilton would replace Bob Barker on The Price Is Right. He auditioned for the show, and in March 2007, TMZ reported that Hamilton was a frontrunner to replace Barker. According to Reuters, Hamilton was one of the final three contenders to host the show, alongside Mark Steines and Todd Newton. However, Drew Carey was named as Barker's successor. Hamilton has hosted the live stage adaptation of the show The Price Is Right Live! In August 2008, Hamilton co-starred in Coma, a web series on Crackle. Hamilton was executive producer of the 2009 film My One and Only, loosely based on his early life and relationship with his mother.

Hamilton was honored with a star on the Hollywood Walk Of Fame on August 12, 2009. In 1999, a Golden Palm Star on the Walk of Stars was dedicated to him. Hamilton appeared as a contestant on the UK edition of I'm a Celebrity...Get Me Out of Here! in November 2009. Hamilton walked out of the jungle on November 30, 2009, telling the other contestants that he wasn't there to win but to have fun. Hamilton was considered one of the favorites to win the series. In 2010 Hamilton was chosen as one of David Hasselhoff's roasters in the Comedy Central Roast of David Hasselhoff. Starting in Fall 2011, Hamilton starred as "Georges" for the national tour of the Tony-winning revival of La Cage aux Folles. He was still starring in the show .

In 2015 George and his ex-wife, Alana Hamilton appeared in Season 4/Episode 10 of Celebrity Wife Swap. Alana swapped with Angela "Big Ang" Raiola of Mob Wives and her husband Neil Murphy. In Summer 2016, Hamilton appeared in television commercials for KFC as the "Extra Crispy Colonel", a deeply tanned version of the company's mascot Colonel Sanders, a role which he returned to in Spring 2018. On July 6, 2018, Hamilton portrayed the Colonel on General Hospital.

Business endeavors
In the late 1980s, Hamilton launched the George Hamilton Skin Care System and the George Hamilton Sun Care System and tanning salons. A cigar lounge bearing his name was opened in the late 1990s at the New York, New York, hotel in Las Vegas and other locations, along with a line of cigars bearing the actor's name. A January 1998 article in Cigar Aficionado described Hamilton's style as "Cary Grant meets Pat Riley".

In April 2006, Hamilton served as grand marshal for the 79th Annual Shenandoah Apple Blossom Festival in Winchester, Virginia. In 2016 and 2018, Hamilton appeared as the "Crispy Colonel" in commercials for KFC, playing on his image for tanning.

Personal life
In 1966, Hamilton had a relationship with Lynda Bird Johnson, the daughter of U.S. President Lyndon B. Johnson. 

From 1972 to 1976, Hamilton was married to actress Alana Stewart. Their son, Ashley George, was born in 1974. The divorced Hamiltons reunited in the mid-1990s to co-host the daytime talk show George & Alana, and again in 2015, as stars of the reality show Stewarts & Hamiltons.

From 1995 to 1999, Hamilton dated Kimberly Blackford, whom he met in Fort Lauderdale when she was a swimsuit model. In December 1999, Kimberly gave birth to their son, George Thomas Hamilton (nicknamed "GT" or George Jr.). Hamilton never married Blackford, but they became friends again as their son got older. Hamilton and both of his sons attended military schools; GT attended Admiral Farragut Academy in St. Petersburg.

As a contestant in I'm A Celebrity in 2009, Hamilton revealed he had dated at least four Miss Worlds. In 2019, Hamilton said he was romantically unattached, but does enjoy dating different ladies.

Hamilton has a well-known social relationship with Imelda Marcos, widow of former Philippine dictator Ferdinand Marcos, and had business ties to the Marcos family. In 1990, Hamilton was named as an unindicted co-conspirator in a federal fraud and racketeering case against the Marcoses involving the looting of government funds; Imelda was acquitted in the case.

According to Burt Reynolds' autobiography, Hamilton has a healthy sense of humor, even when the humor is directed at him. Reynolds wrote that he made up a birthday card for Hamilton with a composite photograph of Tony Curtis and Anthony Perkins, titled "To George, love from Mum and Dad". Hamilton found the card hilarious and showed it to everybody.

My One and Only, a 2009 comedy film starring Logan Lerman, was loosely based on a story about George Hamilton's early life on the road with his mother and brother. It features anecdotes that Hamilton had told to Merv Griffin.

Filmography

Film

 Lone Star (1952) as Noah (uncredited)
 Crime and Punishment U.S.A. (1959) as Robert
 Home from the Hill (1960) as Theron Hunnicutt
 All the Fine Young Cannibals (1960) as Tony McDowall
 Where the Boys Are (1960) as Ryder Smith
 Angel Baby (1961) as Paul Strand
 By Love Possessed (1961) as Warren Winner
 A Thunder of Drums (1961) as Lt. Curtis McQuade
 The Light in the Piazza (1962) as Fabrizio Naccarelli
 Two Weeks in Another Town (1962) as Davie Drew
 The Victors (1963) as Cpl. Theodore Trower
 Act One (1963) as Moss Hart
 Looking for Love (1964) as himself (cameo)
 Your Cheatin' Heart (1964) as Hank Williams
 Viva Maria! (1965) as Flores
 That Man George (1966) as George
 Doctor, You've Got to Be Kidding! (1967) as Harlan Wycliff
 A Time for Killing (1967) as Capt. Dorrit Bentley
 Jack of Diamonds (1967) as Jeff Hill
 The Power (1968) as Prof. Jim Tanner
 Togetherness (1970) as Jack DuPont
 Elvis: That's the Way It Is (1970) as himself (uncredited)
 Evel Knievel (1971) as Evel Knievel
 The Man Who Loved Cat Dancing (1973) as Willard Crocker
 Medusa (1973) as Jeffrey
 Once Is Not Enough (1975) as David Milford
 The Happy Hooker Goes to Washington (1977) as Ward Thompson
 The Magnificent Hustle (1978) as Donald Hightower
 Sextette (1978) as Vance Norton
 From Hell to Victory (1979) as Maurice Bernard
 Love at First Bite (1979) as Count Vladimir Dracula
 Death Car on the Freeway (1979) as Ray Jeffries
 Zorro, The Gay Blade (1981) as Zorro The Gay Blade / Don Diego Vega / Bunny Wigglesworth
 The Godfather Part III (1990) as B. J. Harrison
 Doc Hollywood (1991) as Doctor Halberstrom
 Once Upon a Crime (1992) as Alfonso de la Pena
 Amore! (1993) as Rudolpho Carbonera
 Double Dragon (1994) as Channel 102 News Anchor (uncredited)
 Playback (1996) as Gil Braman
 Meet Wally Sparks (1997) as himself
 8 Heads in a Duffel Bag (1997) as Dick Bennett
 Bulworth (1998) as himself (uncredited)
 Casper Meets Wendy (1998) as Desmond Spellman
 She's Too Tall (1999) as Alonso Palermo
 Off Key (2001) as Armand
 Crocodile Dundee in Los Angeles (2001) as himself (cameo)
 Reflections of Evil (2002) as Duncan Carlyle
 Hollywood Ending (2002) as Ed
 Pets (2002) as Von Steiger ('The Hand')
 The Little Unicorn (2002) as The Great Allonso
 The L.A. Riot Spectacular (2005) as The King of Beverly Hills
 Rumor Has It... (2005) as himself (cameo) (uncredited)
 Melvin Smarty (2012) as Hitman / Mexican Colonel
 Silver Skies (2015) as Phil
 The Congressman (2016) as Laird Devereaux
 Swiped (2018) as Phil Singer
 All Terrain (2022) as Graverly

Television

 The Donna Reed Show (one episode, 1959) as Herbie Shields
 The Rogues (one episode, 1964) as Jamie
 Burke's Law (TV series) Who Killed Mother Goose? (one episode, 1965) as Little John
 A Farewell to Arms (1966) (miniseries) as Lt. Frederick Henry
 Harold Robbins' The Survivors (1969) as Duncan Carlyle
 Paris 7000 (1970) (canceled after 10 episodes) as Jack Brennan
 The Last of the Powerseekers (1971) as Duncan Carlyle
 The Dead Don't Die (1975) as Don Drake
 Columbo: A Deadly State of Mind (1975) as Dr. Marcus Collier
 Roots (1977) (miniseries) as Stephen Bennett
 McCloud: The Great Taxicab Stampede (1977) as Keith Hampton
 The Strange Possession of Mrs. Oliver (1977) as Greg Oliver
 Killer on Board (1977) as Glenn Lyle
 The Users (1978) as Adam Baker
 The Eddie Capra Mysteries (1978 – Episode: "Nightmare at Pendragon Castle")
 The Seekers (1979) (miniseries) as Lt. Hamilton Stovall
 Institute for Revenge (1979) as Alan Roberto
 Express to Terror (1979) as David Belnik
 Death Car on the Freeway (1979) as Ray Jeffries
 The Great Cash Giveaway Getaway (1980) as Hightower
 The Fantastic Miss Piggy Show (1982) (TV special) as himself
 Malibu (1983) (miniseries) as Jay Pomerantz
 Two Fathers' Justice (1985) as Trent Bradley
 Dynasty (cast member from 1985 to 1986) as Joel Abrigore
 Monte Carlo (1986) (miniseries) as Harry Price
 Spies (1987) as Ian Stone
 Poker Alice (1987) as Cousin John Moffit
 Columbo: Caution: Murder Can Be Hazardous to Your Health (1991) as Wade Anders
 The House on Sycamore Street (1992) as J.D. Gantry / Harry Lennox
 Birds of a Feather: It Happened in Hollywood (1993) as himself
  (1993) as Earl Henry von Hohenlodern
 Two Fathers: Justice for the Innocent (1994) as Bradley
 The Bold and the Beautiful (1994)
 George & Alana (1995–1996) as himself
 Vanished (1995) as Malcolm Patterson
 The Guilt (1996) as Alan Van Buren
 Hart to Hart: Till Death Do Us Hart (1996) as Karl Von Ostenberg
 Rough Riders (1997) (miniseries) as William Randolph Hearst
 Miss USA & Miss Universe (1997) as Host
 Jenny (1997–1998) as Guy Hathaway
 Baywatch (1 episode, 1999) as Earl
 P.T. Barnum (1999) as Francis Olmsted
 Nash Bridges (2000) as Raymond Peck
 The Family (2003) as Host
 Las Vegas (guest appearance 2004) as Bernard Taylor
 Too Cool for Christmas (2004) as Santa Claus
 Joey (2005) as himself
 Dancing with the Stars (2006) as Contestant
 I'm a Celebrity...Get Me Out of Here! (2009) as himself
 Comedy Central Roast of David Hasselhoff (2010) as himself – Roaster
 Hot in Cleveland (2013) as Robin
 Stewarts & Hamiltons (8 episodes, 2015) as himself
 Celebrity Wife Swap (1 episode, 2015) as himself
 2 Broke Girls (1 episode, 2016) as Bob
 American Housewife (recurring, 2017–2019) as Spencer Blitz
 General Hospital (July 6, 2018) as Colonel Sanders
 Grace and Frankie (1 episode, 2019) as Jack Patterson

Books
 Life's Little Pleasures (co-authored with Alysse Minkoff) (1998)  
 Don't Mind if I Do (co-authored with William Stadiem) (2009)

References

External links

 
 
 Encyclopedia of Arkansas History & Culture

Living people
1939 births
20th-century American male actors
21st-century American male actors
American male film actors
American male television actors
Film directors from Tennessee
Hackley School alumni
I'm a Celebrity...Get Me Out of Here! (British TV series) participants
Male actors from Memphis, Tennessee
Metro-Goldwyn-Mayer contract players
New Star of the Year (Actor) Golden Globe winners
Participants in American reality television series
People from Blytheville, Arkansas
MGM Records artists